Weinmannia vitiensis is a species of plant in the family Cunoniaceae. It is endemic to Fiji.

References

vitiensis
Endemic flora of Fiji
Taxonomy articles created by Polbot